Thomas Connell Broden (April 6, 1932 – November 23, 2013) was a Canadian ice hockey forward. Broden is the only player to have won the International Ice Hockey Federation's World Championships and the Stanley Cup in the same year (1958).

Playing career
Broden played his entire National Hockey League career with the Montreal Canadiens; it consisted of six regular-season games and seven playoff games.  Overall, he scored two goals and recorded one assist in NHL play. He made his NHL debut in 1956 and retired following the 1958 season.  He won two Stanley Cups with Montreal in 1957 and 1958.

Playing for Canada's Whitby Dunlops, Broden won the IIHF's Oslo tournament in scoring with 12 goals and 7 assists in 7 games, scoring at least one goal in every game of the World Championship. Canada beat the Soviet Union national ice hockey team 4 – 2 to take the gold in the championship.

Post-playing career
After retiring from hockey Broden worked as a senior executive at Molson Breweries for 32 years. He died on November 23, 2013 at a Toronto hospital.

Career statistics

Regular season and playoffs

International

References

Secondary sources

 IIHF News Release, April 2002, Vol. 6 - No. 2

External links
 

1932 births
2013 deaths
Anglophone Quebec people
Arizona Coyotes scouts
Canadian ice hockey centres
Cincinnati Mohawks (IHL) players
Ice hockey people from Montreal
Montreal Canadiens players
Montreal Royals (QSHL) players
Ontario Hockey Association Senior A League (1890–1979) players
Shawinigan-Falls Cataracts (QSHL) players
Stanley Cup champions
Winnipeg Jets (1972–1996) scouts